The tonfa (Okinawan:  ,  lit. old man's staff / "crutch"), also spelled as tongfa or tuifa, also known as T-baton is a melee weapon with its origins in the armed component of Okinawan martial arts. It was traditionally made from red or white oak, and wielded in pairs. The tonfa is believed to have originated in either China, Okinawa or Southeast Asia, where it is used in the respective fighting styles.

History

Traditional origin story
The tonfa belongs to a group of ancient weapons called kobudo weapons.  400 years ago, the Ryukyu islanders used the tonfa against the Japanese samurai. The Japanese took all the weapons of the Ryukyuans. The Ryukyu islanders developed clever ways to defend themselves using everyday objects.  The millstone handle evolved into the tonfa. The tonfa along with the other kobudo weapons were working tools that were used in farming and fishing in ancient Okinawa. The tonfa was used as the handle of a millstone tool to prepare grains.

Regional variants

Although the tonfa is most commonly associated with the Okinawan martial arts, its origin is heavily debated. One of the most commonly cited origins is China, although origins from Indonesia to Okinawa are also possible. Although modern martial artists often cite that the tonfa derives from a millstone handle used by peasants, martial arts in Okinawa were historically practised by the upper classes who imported martial arts from China and elsewhere, and it is likely that the weapon was imported from outside Okinawa. The Chinese and Malay words for the weapon (guai and topang respectively) literally mean "crutch", which may suggest the weapon originating from such device. In Cambodia and Thailand, a similar weapon is used consisting of a pair of short clubs tied onto the forearms, known in Thai as mai sok and in Khmer as staupe.  In Thailand and Malaysia, the mai sok often has a similar design to the tonfa, with a perpendicular handle rather than being tied on. In Vietnam, a similar weapon called the song xỉ is made of a pair of steel or aluminum bars. The song xỉ is used as a small shield to protect the forearms and has a sharp tip at the end to attack.

Types of tonfa
There are different versions of the Okinawa tonfa but the basic design is the same.  The small grip is at one end of the tonfa.  The main body of the tonfa is where there are variations.  The most popular form of tonfa has rounded sides and a rounded bottom which makes a semicircle.   The square tonfa has rectangular faces on the main body of the weapon.   A paddle-shape tonfa has the bottom half wider than the front half and looks like a paddle.    Another tonfa has a rounded body throughout.  A crude pointed tonfa has the front heads and back heads ending in a pointed design.  This can be used for stabbing defense.

Usage
The tonfa can be used for blocking and striking. The tonfa measures about three centimeters past the elbow when gripped. There are three grips, honte-mochi (natural), gyakute-mochi (reverse) and tokushu-mochi (special). The natural grip places the handle in the hand with the long arm resting along the bottom of the forearm. This grip provides protection or brace along one's forearms, and also provides reinforcement for backfist, elbow strikes, and punches. In use, the tonfa can swing out to the gyakute grip for a strike or thrust. Martial artists may also flip the tonfa and grab it by the shaft, called tokushu-mochi. This allows use of the handle as a hook in combat, similar to the kama (sickle). This grip is uncommon but is used in the kata Yaraguwa.

Blocking techniques involve a sidestepping maneuver. This allows the block to stop the attack while providing a way to gain entry. The block can be used to block high attack and low attacks.

See also

 Okinawan weapons
 Hungarian shield
 Salawaku
 Side-handle baton

References

Further reading
 Robert Paturel and Alain Formaggio, Tonfa sécurité, Chiron éditeur, 2001.  . .

Blunt weapons
Clubs and truncheons of Japan
Weapons of Okinawa
Weapons of Japan
pt:Porrete#Tonfa